The Ministry of Defence (MinDef) is the Dutch Ministry responsible for the armed forces of the Netherlands and Veterans Affairs. The Ministry was created in 1813 as the "Ministry of War" and in 1928 was combined with the "Ministry of the Navy". After World War II in the ministries were separated again, in this period the Minister of War and Minister of the Navy were often the same person and the State secretary for the Navy was responsible for daily affairs of the Royal Dutch Navy. In 1959 the ministries were merged. The Ministry is headed by the Minister of Defence, currently Kajsa Ollongren, assisted by the Chief of the Defence of the Netherlands, Onno Eichelsheim since April 2021.

Responsibilities
The ministry has the responsibility for:
 protecting the territory of the Kingdom of the Netherlands (which includes the Netherlands, Curaçao, Sint Maarten and Aruba) and her allies;
 protecting and enhancing the international legal system and stability;
 supporting civil authorities in maintaining order, in case of emergencies and in giving humanitarian aid, both national and international.

Organisation
The ministry consists of the Minister (Kajsa Ollongren) and the State secretary of Defence (Christophe van der Maat), the so-called Central Staff, the Netherlands Armed Forces and two supporting organisations.

The Central Staff of the ministry is led by the Secretary-General, the highest civil servant. The most important elements of the Central Staff are:
 several directorates for policy, personnel, materiel and finance
 the Defence Staff
 the Defence Audit Service
 the Security Authority
 the Military Intelligence and Security Service
 the Military Aviation Authority

The highest military official is the Chief of Defence. He is a four-star general or admiral and controls the branches of the armed forces, which are organised in three operational commands:
 the Royal Netherlands Navy Command;
 the Royal Netherlands Army Command;
 the Royal Netherlands Air Force Command.
The fourth branch of service, the Royal Netherlands Marechaussee, is a gendarmerie force that falls directly under the Secretary-General.

The armed forces are supported by two civil organisations that reside under the Ministry of Defence:
 a Support Command; and
 the Defence Materiel Organization.

The ministry employs over 70,000 civil and military personnel.

See also
 List of Ministers of Defence of the Netherlands
 Defence diplomacy

References

External links
  Ministerie van Defensie (Rijksoverheid)

Netherlands
Defence
Military of the Netherlands
Ministries established in 1813
Netherlands
Netherlands